Omer Madison Kem (November 13, 1855 – February 13, 1942) was an American Populist Party politician.

Early life
Omer Madison Kem was born in Hagerstown, Indiana on November 13, 1855.

Career
He moved to Custer County, Nebraska in 1882 and to Broken Bow, Nebraska in 1890 where he farmed. He was deputy treasurer of Custer County from 1890 to 1891. He was elected as a Populist to the United States House of Representatives from 1891 to 1897, serving first the 3rd district and then the 6th district when the number of representatives from Nebraska was increased following the 1890 Census. He did not run for reelection in 1896.

Kem went to Montrose, Colorado, to grow fruit and raise cattle. He got back into politics by being elected as a member of the Colorado House of Representatives in 1907. He then moved to Cottage Grove, Oregon, in 1908, where he became interested in electric light and power enterprises. He worked and served as president of the Cottage Grove Electric Company until it was sold to Mountain States Power (now PacifiCorp) in 1922. He retired in 1922.

Personal life
Kem married Nancy Lenore Benson in 1874. She died in 1883. He married Alice Maria Lockheart in Nebraska in 1885. He had five daughters and three sons (Claude, Huxley, and Victor).

Death
Kem died in Cottage Grove on February 13, 1942. He was cremated and the ashes scattered.

References

 
 
 
 

1855 births
1942 deaths
People from Hagerstown, Indiana
People's Party members of the United States House of Representatives from Nebraska
Nebraska Populists
People from Cottage Grove, Oregon
People from Custer County, Nebraska
Members of the Colorado House of Representatives
People from Montrose, Colorado
People from Broken Bow, Nebraska
Members of the United States House of Representatives from Nebraska